Ali Jador (also Romanized as ‘Alī Jādor; also known as ‘Alī Chādor) is a village in Hoseynabad Rural District, in the Central District of Shush County, Khuzestan Province, Iran. At the 2006 census, its population was 65, in 11 families.

References 

Populated places in Shush County